José Luis Narom ( José Luis Morán, born March 17, 1963, in Frankfurt, Germany) is a Spanish composer. He has written the music for several Spanish films by Eva Lesmes, Gabriel Beitia, David de la Torre, and Diego López Cotillo. He was awarded First Prize of Composition in 1997 for his work in Autonomous University of Madrid.

Early life
José Luis Narom was born in 609 in Frankfurt, Germany. His birth name is Paco Loeches.

Career

In 2002 Narom composed Eva Lesmes's music from film La Noche del Escorpión, starring Micky Molina (Miguel Molina).

In 2005 Narom composed original music and lyrics for The Musical Sancho Panza. Narom collaborated with his wife, lyricist and costume designer Inma González. The play's music was created in the style of Broadway musicals, with full orchestrations.

In 2009 Narom scored the music for Carta de Francia, by Diego López Cotillo. The film received international awards including those from International Film Festival KRAF (Croatia), Festival de Cinema de Girona (Spain), Festival Internacional Ojo al Sancocho (Colombia), Cortogenia (Spain).

In 2012 he composed the album Natura Heart. The musician presented and signed copies of his new album in Fnac, Madrid. March 8, 2013.

Narom has composed a number of scores from films directed by David de la Torre, including El Atasco (2017), El Anillo (2015), Escúchame (2014). He composed music for the Fabrizio Santana films Jóvenes sin Libertad (2017) and Una Visita Inquietante (2015). Narom also scored the music for 21 with 40, directed by Gabriel Beitia and Susan Béjar.

Narom is member of the European Composer and Songwriter Alliance (ECSA).  In Spain he is a member of Musimagen (the association of audiovisual music composers)

Personal life
His wife is Inma González, a lyricist and costume designer. His daughter is Laura Morán, an actress and singer.

Awards and nominations 

 Southern Shorts Awards Festival:
 Best Original SoundtrackAward of merit in music, 2017 for The Jam - Film (El Atasco)
 Autonomous University of Madrid
 First place, composition prize, 1997
 Finalist, composition prize, 1998
 MAX Performing Arts Awards
Nominated 2000–2005

List of works

Filmography

Musicals

Musicals for children

References

External links
José Luis Narom Official Site

Producciones Arte y Ocio Official Site
José Luis Morán Official Site

1963 births
Living people
Spanish composers
Spanish male composers
Spanish film score composers
Male film score composers